JSCM is an abbreviation for one of the following:

Journal of Supply Chain Management
Japan Society for Composite Materials
Commendation Medal#Joint_Service